HMCS Miramichi (hull number MCB 150) was a  that served in the Royal Canadian Navy and the French Navy. She was named Miramichi Bay, located at the mouth of the Miramichi River in New Brunswick. Entering service in 1954, the vessel served in the Royal Canadian Navy for only a few months before transferring to the French Navy. Renamed La Lorientaise, the ship was used as a minesweeper before converting to a patrol vessel in 1973. The ship was discarded in 1986.

Design and description
The Bay class were designed and ordered as replacements for the Second World War-era minesweepers that the Royal Canadian Navy operated at the time.

They had a complement of 38 officers and ratings.

The Bay-class minesweepers were powered by two GM 12-cylinder diesel engines driving two shafts creating . The ships were armed with one 40 mm Bofors gun and were equipped with minesweeping gear.

Service history
Miramichi was laid down on 13 June 1952 by Saint John Dry Dock and Shipbuilding Co. at Saint John, New Brunswick and was launched on 4 May 1954. The vessel was commissioned into the Royal Canadian Navy on 30 July 1954 at Saint John.

After commissioning, Miramichi spent the next two months in service before being paid off on 1 October 1954. She was transferred to France under the NATO Mutual Aid Agreement on 9 October 1954. The ship commissioned into the French Navy on 13 November 1954. Renamed La Lorientaise the ship served as a minesweeper until 1973 when she had air conditioning installed for use as an overseas territories patrol vessel in the Pacific. She served until 1984. The vessel was stricken in 1986 and broken up at Papeete, Tahiti.

References

Notes

Citations

Sources

 
 
 
 
 
 

Minesweepers of the Royal Canadian Navy
Bay-class minesweepers
Ships built in New Brunswick
1954 ships
Cold War minesweepers of Canada
Bay-class minesweepers of the French Navy
Cold War minesweepers of France